Coloniality of knowledge is a concept that Peruvian sociologist Anibal Quijano developed and adapted to contemporary decolonial thinking. The concept critiques what proponents call the Eurocentric system of knowledge, arguing the legacy of colonialism survives within the domains of knowledge. For decolonial scholars, the coloniality of knowledge is central to the functioning of the coloniality of power and is responsible for turning colonial subjects into victims of the coloniality of being, a term that refers to the lived experiences of colonized peoples.

Origin and development
According to Fregoso Bailón and De Lissovoy, Hatuey, a Taíno indigenous warrior from the colonial island La Española, which contains Haiti and the Dominican Republic, was among the first to perceive "Western knowledge as a colonial discourse". Inspired by Hatuey, Antonio de Montesinos began his career as an educator in 1511, teaching critical thinking to Bartolomé de las Casas. In the contemporary era, Frantz Fanon is considered an influential figure who critiqued the intellectual aspects of colonialism. For Fanon, "colonialism is a psychic and epistemological process as much as a material one". Quijano expanded on this insight and advanced the critique of intellectual dimensions of colonialism.

The concept of coloniality of knowledge is derived from the theories of coloniality. The idea of coloniality or "global coloniality" consists of coloniality of power, coloniality of being, and coloniality of knowledge. The concept of coloniality of knowledge originated in an article written in 1992 by Peruvian sociologist Anibal Quijano, who developed the concept as part of a wider discussion on global systems of power, knowledge, racial hierarchy, and capitalism in the context of Latin American historical and cultural events from the fourteenth century to the present. Decolonial thinkers including Walter Mignolo, Enrique Dussel, and Santiago Castro-Gómez later expanded the concept.

Background
According to Quijano, colonialism has had a particular influence on colonized cultures' modes of knowing, knowledge production, perspectives, visions; and systems of images, symbols, and modes of signification; along with their resources, patterns, and instruments of formalized and objectivised expression. For Quijano, this suppression of knowledge accompanied the annihilation of indigenous populations throughout the continent, as well as indigenous societies and traditions. Quijano said the patterns of suppression, expropriation, and imposition of knowledge created during the colonial period, as refracted through conceptions of race and racial hierarchy, persisted after colonialism was overturned as "an explicit political order". This persists in numerous "colonial situations" in which individuals and groups in historically colonized regions are excluded and exploited. Decolonial scholars refer to this ongoing legacy of colonialism as "coloniality", which describes colonialism's perceived legacy of oppression and exploitation across many inter-related domains, including knowledge. Ndlovu-Gatsheni cites Quijano, referring to "control of economy; control of authority, control of gender and sexuality; and, control of subjectivity and knowledge".

Theoretical perspective
For Nelson Maldonado-Torres, coloniality denotes the long-standing power structures that developed as a result of colonialism but continue to have an impact on culture, labor, interpersonal relations, and knowledge production that extends far beyond the formal boundaries of colonial administrations. It lives on in literature, academic achievement standards, cultural trends, common sense, people's self-images, personal goals, and other aspects of modern life. Anibal Quijano described this power structure as "coloniality of power" that is predicated on the idea of "coloniality of knowledge", which is "central to the operation of the coloniality of power". While the term coloniality of power refers to the inter-relationship between "modern forms of exploitation and domination", the term coloniality of knowledge concerns the influence of colonialism on domains of knowledge production. Karen Tucker identifies the "coloniality of knowledge" as "one of multiple, intersecting forms of oppression" within a system of "global coloniality". The coloniality of knowledge "appropriates meaning" in the same manner as coloniality of power "takes authority, appropriates land, and exploits labor".

The coloniality of knowledge raises epistemological concerns such as who creates what knowledge and for what purpose, the relevance and irrelevance of knowledge, and how specific knowledges disempower or empower certain peoples and communities. The thesis directly or implicitly questions fundamental epistemological categories and attitudes such as belief and the pursuit of objective truth, the concept of the rational subject, the epistemological distinction between the knowing subject and the known object, the assumption of "the universal validity of scientific knowledge, and the universality of human nature". According to this theory, these categories and attitudes are "Eurocentric constructions" that are intrinsically infused with what may be called the "colonial will to dominate". Decolonial theorists refer to "Eurocentric knowledge system", which they believe had assigned the creation of knowledge to Europeans and prioritized the use of European methods of knowledge production. According to Quijano, the hegemony of Europe over the new paradigm of global power consolidated all forms of control over subjectivity, culture and, in particular, knowledge and the creation of knowledge under its hegemony. This resulted in the denial of knowledge creation to conquered peoples on the one hand, and the repression of traditional forms of knowledge production on the other, based on the hierarchical structure's superiority/inferiority relationship.

Quijano characterizes Eurocentric knowledge as a "specific rationality or perspective of knowledge that was made globally hegemonic" through the intertwined operation of colonialism and capitalism. It works by constructing binary hierarchical relationships between "the categories of object" and symbolizes a specific secular, instrumental, and "technocratic rationality" that Quijano contextualizes in reference to the mid-seventeen century West European thought and the demands of nineteenth-century global capitalist expansion. For Quijano, it codifies relations between Western Europe and the rest of the world using categories such as "primitive-civilized", "irrational-rational", and "traditional-modern"; and creates distinctions and hierarchies between them so "non-Europe" is aligned with the past and is thus "inferior, if not always primitive". Similarly, it codifies the relationship between Western Europe and "non-Europe" as one between subject and object, perpetuating the myth that Western Europe is the only source of reliable knowledge. For Quijano, the "Western epistemological paradigm" suggests:

The subject-object dualism proposed by Quijano and other decolonial thinkers such as Enrique Dussel is based on a particular reading of René Descartes' idea of cogito. The "I" in the iconic expression "I think, therefore I am" is an imperial "I" that, according to Quijano, "made it possible to omit every reference to any other 'subject' outside the European context".

According to the decolonial perspective, coloniality of knowledge thus refers to historically entrenched and racially driven intellectual practices that continuously elevate the forms of knowledge and "knowledge-generating principles" of colonizing civilizations while downgrading those of colonized societies. It stresses the role of knowledge in the "violences" that defined colonial rule, as well as the function of knowledge in sustaining the perceived racial hierarchization and oppression that were created over this time period.

Aspects
Sarah Lucia Hoagland identified four aspects of the coloniality of "Anglo-European knowledge practice":

 The coloniality of knowledge entails Anglo-Eurocentric practices, in which "the only discourse for articulating Third World women's lives is a norming and normative Anglo-European one". For Hoagland, Western researchers evaluate their non-Western subjects through the lens of the Western conception of "woman". In so doing, Western feminists interpret their subjects through Western categories and ideals by interpolating them into Western semiotics and practices. Many Western feminist researchers, she said, perceive their subjects through cultural constructs that only see them as deficient to Western notions of womanhood and hence in desperate "need of enlightened rescue".
 The research subject is analyzed solely through the perspective of rationality as defined by modern epistemology. Hoagland cites Anibal Quijano, who argues the coloniality of knowledge practices began with the Spanish colonization of the Americas in the fifteenth century, making it "unthinkable to accept the idea that a knowing subject was possible beyond the subject of knowledge postulated by the very concept of rationality" enshrined in modern epistemology. 
 Research methodologies assume "knowing (authorized) subjects" are the sole agents in research activities, and it is their "prerogative" to interpret and package information inside authorizing institutions. Consequently, "Western scientific practice" establishes the researcher "as a judge of credibility and a gatekeeper for its authority", which she identifies as "a discursive enactment of colonial relations". Such an approach is based on the assumption Western academics are disciplined to perceive "interpretation and packaging of information" as the domain of "the knowing subject", the researcher, rather than the "subject of knowing, the one being researched". Because only the researcher is thought to have the rightful agency to do so. According to Hoagland, the knowing subject must be examined with the same degree of care as the subjects of knowledge that the knowing subjects scrutinize. 
 The coloniality of knowledge "presumes commensurability with Western discourse", and is the practice of "translating and rewriting other cultures, other knowledges, and other ways of being" into Western system of thought. Hoagland said reframing indigenous claims to make them understandable inside Western institutions amounts to rewriting to the point of eliminating indigenous culture. Because such a subject of knowing of research is not "approached as a knowing subject on her own terms" as "she falls short as a knowing subject on Western terms", she is not "rational" and does not function with and embrace individuality.

According to Nick Shepherd, the coloniality of knowledge has three dimensions; structural and logistical, epistemological, and ethical and moral. For Shepherd, data or information flowed in one direction and were essentially extractive in nature. Information, observations, and artifacts were transported from the global south and east to  Europe and North America, where they were processed and published. Scholars in metropolitan institutions were eventually given precedence in the discipline's rank and hierarchy, while those in the global south were considered as "local enablers or collaborators on the ground". They were frequently referred to as "informants", "diggers", or simply "boys". Although this has been defined as a historical situation, Shepherd said this practice continues, and forms the structural and logistical aspects of the coloniality of knowledge.

In its epistemological dimension, Shepherd said coloniality of knowledge calls into question the commonly held categories and notions that characterize the intellectual process, as well as an understanding of what knowledge is and how it works. It entails comprehending how the conjoined settings of colonialism and modernity manifest themselves in the ways knowledge is conceptualized and formed in various disciplines. In its ethical and moral dimensions, coloniality of knowledge refers to the rights and entitlements that disciplinary practitioners acquire as part of their training, allowing them to interfere in locations and circumstances as a scientific right and as a moral act. Shepherd cites examples from archaeology, in which extractions were carried out in sacred places revered by the locals.

Similarly, Aram Ziai et al identified the "problem of coloniality"  in three  distinct but interconnected levels of knowledge production.

Effects
According to William Mpofu, the coloniality of knowledge transforms colonial subjects into "victims of the coloniality of being", "a condition of inferiorisation, peripheralization, and dehumanization", which makes "primary reference to the lived experience of colonization and its impact on language". The coloniality of knowledge thesis asserts educational institutions reflect "the entanglement of coloniality, power, and the epistemic ego-politics of knowledge", which explains the "bias" that promotes Westernized knowledge production as impartial, objective, and universal while rejecting knowledge production influenced by "sociopolitical location, lived experience, and social relations" as "inferior and pseudo-scientific". Poloma et al said the worldwide domination of the Euro-American university model epitomizes coloniality of knowledge, which is reinforced through the canonization of Western curricula, the primacy of English language in instruction and research, and the fetishism of global rankings and Euro-American certification in third world countries.

Silova et al  said the coloniality of knowledge production has unwittingly formed academic identities, both socializing "non-Western or not-so-Western" researchers into Western ways of thought and marginalizing them in knowledge creation processes, resulting in "academic mimetism" or "intellectual mimicry". The coloniality of knowledge has led to the formation of a knowledge barrier that prevents students and academics from generating new knowledge by adopting non-Western concepts. It also has a significant impact on the mainstream curriculum, which is founded on the same Western notions and paradigms, making it difficult for students to advance beyond the Western epistemological framework.

Critical evaluation
In a 2020 article, Paul Anthony Chambers said the theory of the coloniality of knowledge, which proposes a link between the legacy of colonialism and the production, validation, and transfer of knowledge, is "problematic" in some respects, particularly in its critique of Cartesian epistemology. An example of the latter is a 2012 chapter by Sarah Lucia Hoagland that cites Quijano and says that Cartesian methodology practices "the cognitive dismissal of all that lies outside of its bounds of sense ... resulting in a highly sophisticated Eurocentrism". For Hoagland, this tradition maintains "power relations by denying epistemic credibility to objects/subjects of knowledge who are marginalized, written subaltern, erased, criminalized ... and thereby denying relationality". (Chambers and Hoagland both cite Quijano but do not cite each other.)

While Chambers agreed with much of what the theory of the coloniality of knowledge asserts, he critiqued it for "fail[ing] to adequately demonstrate" how Cartesian/Western epistemology is tied to inequitable patterns of global knowledge production as well as larger forms of dominance and exploitation. Chambers recognized "the problematic political and sociological dimensions of knowledge production", which he said the decolonial thinkers also emphasized, but he objected to some of the underlying arguments of the thesis, which blamed Cartesian epistemology for "unjust structures of global knowledge production"; he argued that this thesis fails to explain how Cartesian epistemology has had the impact claimed by the decolonial thinkers.

Chambers said: Quijano's claims are based on a questionable connection between the Cartesian epistemological categories of subject and object and the ideological and racist belief that Europeans were naturally superior to Indians and other colonized peoples who were deemed – although not by all Europeans, e.g. Las Casas – to be inferior because incapable of rational thought and hence more akin to children and therefore effectively non-autonomous "objects". He also said: "While such a view is infamously to be found in Kant, there is no evidence of it in Descartes".

References

Notes

Sources

Further reading

External links
 Coloniality of Knowledge — University of Rostock
 What Fundamentally is Coloniality of Knowledge? — The Sunday News
 Giving testimony and the coloniality of knowledge — International Association for Women Philosophers

Postcolonialism
Decolonization
Critical theory